The 2009 European Parliament election in Luxembourg was the election of the delegation from Luxembourg to the European Parliament in 2009.  It was held on the same day as the elections to the national legislature, the Chamber of Deputies.

Parties
The election was contested by the same eight parties that contested the simultaneous election to the Chamber.  These included the seven parties that ran in the 2004 election: Christian Social People's Party (CSV), Luxembourg Socialist Workers' Party (LSAP), the Greens, the Democratic Party (DP), the Alternative Democratic Reform Party (ADR), the Left, and the Communist Party (KPL).  The addition for the 2009 election is the Citizens' List, which was led by current independent deputy Aly Jaerling.

Results

References

Luxembourg
European Parliament elections in Luxembourg
2009 in Luxembourg